The 2012 Winter Youth Olympic Games, officially known as the I Winter Youth Olympic Games (YOG), were an international multi-sport event for youths that took place in Innsbruck, Austria, on 13–22 January 2012. They were the inaugural Winter Youth Olympics, a major sports and cultural festival celebrated in the tradition of the Olympic Games. Approximately 1100 athletes from 70 countries competed. The decision for Innsbruck to host the Games was announced on 12 December 2008 after mail voting by 105 International Olympic Committee (IOC) members. Innsbruck is the first city to host three winter Olympic events, having previously hosted the 1964 Winter Olympics and the 1976 Winter Olympics.

Organization

Host city election

All four applicant cities were kept as candidate cities by the IOC in August 2008. Swedish skier Pernilla Wiberg was the Evaluation Chair for the commission to score the applicant cities. In November 2008, two cities (Harbin and Lillehammer) were cut from the list, leaving both Kuopio and Innsbruck in the running. On 12 December, the final vote was revealed to be 84 votes to 15, with Innsbruck winning the hosting rights.

Infrastructure and budget
All venues that will be used for the 2012 Winter Youth Olympics were existing (besides the athlete's village) when Innsbruck was awarded the games in 2008. Innsbruck thus proposed a budget of $22.5 million USDs to host and stage the games. The athlete's village will cost roughly $121 million to build.

Marketing

Marketing for the games included sponsor BMW painting cars with the Innsbruck 2012 logo and information to spread awareness across Austria.

Sponsors
There are twelve official worldwide partners of the International Olympic Committee such as McDonald's and Coca-Cola, which have been designated as "World Olympic Partners" by the organizing committee for the event. The organizing committee also designated fifteen companies as official sponsors and suppliers of which include BMW and Raiffeisen Zentralbank among others. About 60% of the costs associated with the games are expected to be covered by sponsorship by the various companies.

Mascot

The official mascot of the 2012 Winter Youth Olympics is an anthropomorphic chamois named Yoggl (pronounced YOG). The name is a compound of "Joggl", the Tyrolean nickname for Jakob, and YOG, the acronym of the Youth Olympic Games. He represents respect for nature, the lifestyles and geography of the host country, modernity, youth, and athleticism. The mascot was designed by Florencia Demaría and Luis Andrés Abbiati of Argentina.

Venues

All of the venues are located at venue clusters in two major zones in Innsbruck and Seefeld, Olympiaworld Innsbruck and Seefeld Arena. All venues are existing with the exception of the curling and biathlon venues, which will be temporary.

Torch relay
The torch relay of the Games was announced on 9 October 2011, involving 65 sites over 18 days with some 2,012 torchbearers carrying the flame. The torch was lit on 17 December 2011 in Athens, Greece by the first torchbearer Carlos Pecharromán from Spain and the relay began in Innsbruck on 27 December 2011 and ended with the opening ceremony in Bergiselschanze on 13 January 2012. It is the first time the Olympic flame had gone to the same city three times as Innsbruck was also the host of the Winter Olympic Games in 1964 and 1976.

Below is the list of route locations:

27 December: Innsbruck, Neustift im Stubaital, Sölden, Ischgl
28 December: Jerzens, Bregenz, Lustenau, Klaus, Bludenz
29 December: Sankt Anton am Arlberg, Matrei, Lienz, Dellach
30 December: Millstatt, Klagenfurt, Wolfsberg, Murau
31 December: Kapfenberg, Semmering, Wiener Neudorf
1 January: Vienna, Mönichkirchen
2 January: Bad Waltersdorf, Fürstenfeld
3 January: Graz, Gleisdorf, Oberpullendorf
4 January: Eisenstadt, Schwechat, Vösendorf, Sankt Pölten
5 January: Waidhofen an der Ybbs, Purgstall, Linz, Wels
6 January: Hinterstoder, Gmunden, Mondsee, Neumarkt am Wallersee, Salzburg, Hallein
7 January: Wals, Strobl, Gosau, Filzmoos
8 January: Ramsau, Niederoblarn, Haus
9 January: Schladming, Sankt Johann im Pongau, Maria Alm
10 January: Kirchberg, Bad Gastein, Zell am See
11 January: Seefeld, Kühtai, Fugen
12 January: Sankt Ulrich am Pillersee, Ehrwald, Telfs, Zirl
13 January: Kufstein, Axams, Mutters, Fulpmes, Lans

The Games

Opening ceremony

The opening ceremony of the games took place on 13 January 2012, at 6:30 pm CET (5:30 UTC, 13 January) at Bergiselschanze. Roughly 15,000 people packed the snow-filled stadium to watch the ceremony, where for the first time three cauldrons were lit (instead of the normal 1) to commemorate the previous two Winter Olympics Innsbruck has hosted (1964 and 1976). Heinz Fischer, the President of Austria declared the games open.

Closing ceremony
The Closing ceremony took place on 22 January. IOC President Jacques Rogge stated that the first Winter Youth Olympic Games were "ten glorious days" and that the games "exceeded all expectations and laid solid foundations for future Youth Olympic Games".

Participating nations
In accordance with IOC guidelines, only youths aged between 14 and 19 years were able to participate in the 2012 Winter Youth Olympics. Unlike the Olympic Games, the youth athletes taking part in the YOG will be expected to stay in the host city throughout the Games to take part in an integrated sport and culture and education programme (CEP). The qualification criteria for participation in the Games differs by sport, and are determined by the NOCs and international sports federations.

Sports
The YOG featured 63 medal events over 7 sports and 15 disciplines. 63 events, there will be 3 mixed team events (Mixed-NOCs), 8 mixed team events (NOCs), 27 men's events, and 25 women's events.

Calendar

Medal table
 
The top ten listed National Olympic Committees (NOCs) by number of gold medals are listed below with the host nation, Austria, being highlighted. A competition was announced in early 2011 to design the medals that were awarded at the games.

Medals won by teams of athletes from more than one NOC are included in the table as medals awarded to a mixed-NOCs team. There were three events which composed entirely of mixed-NOCs teams, and as such all nine medals in these events, were swept by mixed-NOCs teams.

References

External links

Youth Olympic Games official web site
Results Book

 
Winter Youth Olympics
Winter Youth Olympics 2012
Winter Youth Olympics
Olympic Games in Austria
Winter multi-sport events in Austria
Youth sport in Austria
Youth Olympic Games by year
Sports competitions in Innsbruck
2012 in youth sport
January 2012 sports events in Europe
2010s in Innsbruck
2012 in winter sports